Bolshaya Tovra is a rural locality (a village) in Kholmogorsky District, Arkhangelsk Oblast, Russia. The population was 20 as of 2012.

Geography 
Bolshaya Tovra is located 24 km south of Kholmogory (the district's administrative centre) by road. Malaya Tovra is the nearest rural locality.

References 

Rural localities in Kholmogorsky District